Santa Fé Ararense Atlético Club, commonly known as Santa Fé, is a Brazilian football club based in Arara, Paraíba state.

References

Association football clubs established in 1965
Football clubs in Paraíba
1965 establishments in Brazil